Wilse is a surname. Notable people with the surname include:

Anders Beer Wilse (1865–1949), Norwegian photographer
Jacob Nicolai Wilse (1736–1801), Norwegian writer and meteorologist
Liv Wilse (1931–1994), Norwegian actress and singer